The 2020–21 Willem II season was the club's 125th season in existence and the club's 7th consecutive season in the top flight of Dutch football. In addition to the domestic league, Willem II participated in this season's editions of the KNVB Cup and the UEFA Europa League. The season covered the period from 1 July 2020 to 30 June 2021.

Players

First-team squad

Out on loan

Transfers

In

Out

Pre-season and friendlies

Competitions

Overview

Eredivisie

League table

Results summary

Results by round

Matches
The league fixtures were announced on 24 July 2020.

KNVB Cup

UEFA Europa League

Statistics

Goalscorers

References

External links

Willem II (football club) seasons
Willem II
Willem II